John Volk (September 28, 1915 – November 23, 2008) was a Wisconsin politician.

Born in Freedom, Forest County, Wisconsin, Volk was a farmer. He served as town chairman of Freedom in the 1940s. In a special election in June 1983, he was elected to the Wisconsin State Assembly, serving until 1991. He was a Democrat.

References

People from Forest County, Wisconsin
Farmers from Wisconsin
Mayors of places in Wisconsin
1915 births
2008 deaths
20th-century American politicians
Democratic Party members of the Wisconsin State Assembly